The 1994 Arab Cup Winners' Cup was the fifth edition of the Arab Cup Winners' Cup held in Cairo, Egypt between 10 – 19 Mar 1995, one year after. The teams represented Arab nations from Africa and Asia.
Al-Ahly of Egypt won the final against Al-Shabab of Saudi Arabia.

Preliminary stage

Zone 1 (Gulf Area)

Al-Arabi and Qadsia SC advanced to the final tournament.

Zone 2 (Red Sea)

Al-Shabab advanced to the final tournament.

Zone 3 (North Africa)

AS Marsa advanced to the final tournament.

Zone 4 (East Region)

Al-Faisaly and Shabab Rafah advanced to the final tournament.

Group stage

The eight teams were drawn into two groups of four. Each group was played on one leg basis. The winners and runners-up of each group advanced to the semi-finals.

Group 1

Group 2

Knock-out stage

Semi-finals

Final

Winners

External links
Arab Cup Winners' Cup 1994 - rsssf.com

1994
1994
1994–95 in Egyptian football
1994–95 in Qatari football
1994–95 in Kuwaiti football
1994–95 in Moroccan football
1994–95 in Saudi Arabian football
1994–95 in Algerian football
1994 in African football
1994 in Asian football